Andrei Mihai Hergheligiu (born 21 March 1992) is a Romanian professional footballer who plays as a forward for Liga III club Corvinul Hunedoara. He also played for Liga I teams such as Politehnica Iaşi, CS Universitatea Craiova or FC Hermannstadt.

Club career

Youth

Hergheligiu started his career as a youth at LPS Iași. He then moved to the youth team of local club Politehnica Iași

Politehnica Iași

After the dissolution of FC Politehnica Iași (1945) in the summer of 2010, Hergheligiu joined the newly formed FC Politehnica Iaşi now playing in the second tier of Romanian football.

At the end of his second season at the team, Politehnica Iași gained promotion to Liga I with the help of Hergheligiu, who scored 7 goals from 26 appearances. On 17 August, he scored his first Liga I goal against CFR Cluj to aid his team to a 2–2 draw.

Universitatea Craiova

In the summer of 2014, after he finished his contract with Politehnica Iași, Hergheligiu and teammate Adrian Avrămia, were signed by CS Universitatea Craiova.

He scored his first goal, and also registered an assist, on 29 November, in the 2–0 win against Ceahlăul Piatra Neamț.

Honours
CSMS Iași
Liga II (2): 2011–12, 2013–14

Hermannstadt
Cupa României: Runner-up 2017–18

CS Hunedoara
Liga III: 2021–22

References

External links

Profile at FC Hermannstadt

1992 births
Living people
Sportspeople from Iași
Romanian footballers
Association football forwards
Liga I players
Liga II players
Liga III players
FC Politehnica Iași (1945) players
FC Politehnica Iași (2010) players
CS Universitatea Craiova players
FC Botoșani players
CS Luceafărul Oradea players
FC Hermannstadt players
CS Mioveni players
CS Concordia Chiajna players
CS Corvinul Hunedoara players